Reshma (1978/1979 – 21 June 2021) was an Indian actress who appeared in the Tamil cinema.

Career
Born as Shanthi, she adopted the stage name of Reshma and made her debut with Kizhakku Mugam (1996) alongside Karthik. The success of the film meant she was signed on to appear in Kalanjiyam's Poomani (1996), and also briefly shot for Nandha featuring Ramki, which did not get completed. Another film titled Aththai Ponnu alongside Vignesh was also shelved during shoot in 1997.

Reshma also signed on to play the title role in Vennila to appear alongside Ajith Kumar, Vignesh and Amar Siddique. Though the film began production works in 1996, it was duly delayed due to financial problems with the film finally releasing with the title Ennai Thalatta Varuvala in March 2003.

Personal life
Reshma married actor Hamsavardhan, her co-star from Vadagupatti Maapillai (2001). The couple had two sons and a daughter.

Death
She died aged 42 on 21 June 2021, following complications caused by COVID-19.

Filmography

Television

References

1970s births
2021 deaths
Actresses in Tamil cinema
Indian film actresses
Year of birth missing
20th-century Indian actresses
21st-century Indian actresses
Actresses in Malayalam cinema
Place of birth missing
Place of death missing
Actresses in Tamil television
Actresses in Kannada cinema
Actresses in Telugu cinema
Deaths from the COVID-19 pandemic in India